The 2003 Southern Illinois Salukis football team represented Southern Illinois University as a member of the Gateway Football Conference during the 2003 NCAA Division I-AA football season. They were led by third-year head coach Jerry Kill and played their home games at McAndrew Stadium in Carbondale, Illinois. The Salukis finished the season with a 10–2 record overall and a 6–1 record in conference play, making them conference co-champions with Northern Iowa. The team received an at-large bid to the Division I-AA playoffs, where they lost to Delaware in the first round. Southern Illinois was ranked No. 9 in The Sports Network's postseason ranking of FCS teams.

Schedule

References

Southern Illinois
Southern Illinois Salukis football seasons
Missouri Valley Football Conference champion seasons
Southern Illinois Salukis football